Noroeste Rio-Grandense was one of the seven Mesoregions on the state of Rio Grande do Sul in Brazil. It included 216 municipalities grouped in thirteen microregions. The IBGE has since discontinued the microregion system for population tracking, replacing it with the term "immediate geographic region".

Microregions 
 Carazinho
 Cerro Largo
 Cruz Alta
 Erechim
 Frederico Westphalen
 Ijuí
 Não-Me-Toque
 Passo Fundo
 Sananduva
 Santa Rosa
 Santo Ângelo
 Soledade
 Três Passos

References 

Mesoregions of Rio Grande do Sul